Salma Khatun  (born 1 October 1990) is a Bangladeshi cricketer who plays for the Bangladesh cricket team. She plays as right-handed batter and right-arm off break bowler. She was the captain of Bangladesh between 2008 and 2020, including captaining the side in their first One Day International and Twenty20 International.

Early life and background
Salma Khatun was born on 1 October 1990 in Khulna, Bangladesh. She started at first to play cricket with the boys in Khulna. She was trained  under her coach Imtiaz Hossain Pilu.

Career
Bangladesh women team won historic silver medal in Asian games Women cricket competition in 2010 against China national women's cricket team. She was part of the team at the Asian Games in Guangzhou, China.

Salma made her T20I debut against Ireland on 28 August 2012. In June 2018, she was part of Bangladesh's squad that won their first ever Women's Asia Cup title, winning the 2018 Women's Twenty20 Asia Cup tournament. Later the same month, she was named as the captain of Bangladesh for the 2018 ICC Women's World Twenty20 Qualifier tournament.

In October 2018, she was named as the captain of Bangladesh's squad for the 2018 ICC Women's World Twenty20 tournament in the West Indies. She was the joint-leading wicket-taker for Bangladesh in the tournament, with six dismissals in four matches.

In August 2019, she was named as the captain of Bangladesh's squad for the 2019 ICC Women's World Twenty20 Qualifier tournament in Scotland. In November 2019, she was named as the captain of Bangladesh's squad for the cricket tournament at the 2019 South Asian Games. The Bangladesh team beat Sri Lanka by two runs in the final to win the gold medal.

In January 2020, she was named as the captain of Bangladesh's squad for the 2020 ICC Women's T20 World Cup in Australia. She was the leading wicket-taker for Bangladesh in the tournament, with six dismissals in four matches.

In November 2021, she was named in Bangladesh's team for the 2021 Women's Cricket World Cup Qualifier tournament in Zimbabwe. In January 2022, she was named in Bangladesh's team for the 2022 Commonwealth Games Cricket Qualifier tournament in Malaysia. Later the same month, she was named in Bangladesh's team for the 2022 Women's Cricket World Cup in New Zealand.

References

External links
 
 

1990 births
Living people
People from Khulna
Bangladeshi women cricketers
Bangladesh women One Day International cricketers
Bangladesh women Twenty20 International cricketers
Khulna Division women cricketers
Dhaka Division women cricketers
IPL Trailblazers cricketers
Southern Zone women cricketers
Asian Games medalists in cricket
Cricketers at the 2010 Asian Games
Cricketers at the 2014 Asian Games
Bangladeshi women cricket captains
Asian Games silver medalists for Bangladesh
Medalists at the 2010 Asian Games
Medalists at the 2014 Asian Games
South Asian Games gold medalists for Bangladesh
South Asian Games medalists in cricket